Andrew Rutherford (born 4 March 1972) is a Hong Kong swimmer. He competed in three events at the 1992 Summer Olympics.

References

External links
 

1972 births
Living people
Hong Kong male breaststroke swimmers
Olympic swimmers of Hong Kong
Swimmers at the 1992 Summer Olympics
Place of birth missing (living people)